Iskrzycki (feminine: Iskrzycka; plural: Iskrzyccy) is a Polish surname. The Russian-language equivalent is Iskritsky.

Notable people with this surname include:

 Andrzej Iskrzycki (born 1951), Polish ice hockey player
 Justyna Iskrzycka (born 1997), Polish sprint canoeist

See also
 

Polish-language surnames